The "Islamic Bill of Rights for Women in the Mosque" is a list crafted by Muslim and feminist author Asra Nomani.
The Bill made developments in the United States in 2004, headed by the Daughters of Hajar

History
"The Islamic Bill of Rights for Women in the Mosque" was authored by along with the Islamic Bill of Rights for Women in the Bedroom, and the 99 Precepts for Opening Hearts, Minds and Doors in the Muslim World was written with the end of making Islam more progressive.

Nomani wrote it in honor of the ancestral matriarch of the Arabs Hajar who stood alone with her son Ismael in the Arabian desert and through which her courage permitted the lineage which became the Arabs to survive.

The Islamic Bill of Rights for Women in the Mosque was written upon her return from Mecca where Nomani noted the egalitarian treatment of all individuals which she found to be lacking upon her return to her local mosque in Morgantown.

The Islamic Bill of Rights for Women in the Mosque 

The Islamic Bill of Rights for Women in the Mosque lists 10 rights that women should be granted in regard to  their participation at the Mosque, such as entering the Mosque through the main entry door, and not be required to only enter through the back and to have full access to the Mosque without separation by artificial barriers designed to segregate women from the men. The list goes on to grant women the right to freely address the members of the congregation whether they be men or women and to hold leadership positions as well as to receive equal treatment as the men.

 Women have an Islamic right to enter a mosque.
 Women have an Islamic right to enter through the main door.
 Women have an Islamic right to visual and auditory access to the musalla (main sanctuary). 
 Women have an Islamic right to pray in the musalla without being separated by a barrier, including in the front and in mixed-gender congregational lines.
 Women have an Islamic right to address any and all members of the congregation.
 Women have an Islamic right to hold leadership positions, including positions as prayer leaders, or imams, and as members of the board of directors and management committees.
 Women have an Islamic right to be full participants in all congregational activities.
 Women have an Islamic right to lead and participate in meetings, study sessions, and other community activities without being separated by a barrier.
 Women have an Islamic right to be greeted and addressed cordially.
 Women have an Islamic right to respectful treatment and exemption from gossip and slander.

See also
Kithaab
Sex segregation in Islam
Women in Islam

References

External links 
The Islamic Bill of Rights for Women in Mosques
Asra Nomani's Website
CNN interview discussing Asra Nomani's 3 Islamic Bills of Rights
Coverage at BeliefNet
Audio coverage by WNYC
Coverage by The American Prospect
Living Islam Out Loud: American Muslim Women Speak , a book discussing this Bill of Rights is reviewed by Eve Ensler and selected by the AAUP for public and secondary school libraries
Coverage by Al Jazeera
Coverage by Newsline Pakistan
Coverage by The Washington Post
Coverage by Sojourners Magazine
Coverage at Living Islam
Coverage by the Center for American Progress
Coverage at Brandeis University

Islamic feminism
Sex segregation and Islam
Women's rights in Islam